Masahiro 'Masa' Yamamoto (born August 11, 1965, in Chigasaki, Kanagawa Prefecture) is a left-handed, retired Japanese professional baseball pitcher. A screwballer, Yamamoto pitched for the Chunichi Dragons in Japan's Nippon Professional Baseball for 29 years from 1986 to 2015. He is the oldest Japanese pitcher to win a baseball game. With 200+ career victories, he is a member of Meikyukai.

Biography 
Yamamoto attended Nichidai Fujisawa High School, and was selected at age 18 by Chunichi.

Yamamoto was the Central League Earned Run Average Champion in 1993, posting a 2.05 ERA.
He won the 1994 Eiji Sawamura Award, going 19–8 with 3.49 ERA and 14 complete games.

On September 16, 2006, Yamamoto threw a no-hitter against the Hanshin Tigers, becoming the oldest pitcher in NPB to throw a no-hit game.

On September 5, 2014, Yamamoto won his first and only start of the season at Nagoya Dome in a shutout match against the Hanshin Tigers, making him the oldest Japanese pitcher to win a game, at 49 years, 25 days, surpassing the old mark of 48 years, 4 months set by the Hankyu Braves’ Shinji Hamazaki in 1950. During the game, he threw 90 pitches in five scoreless innings, gave up five hits and a walk, and striking out two.

Yamamoto has pitched in six Japan Series with the Dragons, with his team winning once (in 2007).

See also 
 List of top Nippon Professional Baseball strikeout pitchers

References

External links

NPB.com

1965 births
Chunichi Dragons players
Japanese Baseball Hall of Fame inductees
Japanese expatriate baseball players in the United States
Living people
Baseball people from Kanagawa Prefecture
Nippon Professional Baseball pitchers
People from Chigasaki, Kanagawa
Vero Beach Dodgers players